Salah Hasaballah is an Egyptian government official and media spokesperson for Egypt's House of Representatives.

Biography 
Dr. Salah Hasaballah is a member of the Egyptian Parliament, elected by the first district of Shubra El Kheima in Qalyubia Governorate. He was chosen as media spokesperson by Dr. Ali Abdel Aal, Speaker of the House of Representatives, to respond to criticisms of the House, control the representation of the House in media and cooperate with journalists and media professionals to convey accurate information about the House's activities. Hasaballah is also the official spokesman for the Egyptian Support Coalition.

Hasaballah was head of the Elhouria Party until he announced that he was stepping down due to his preoccupation with the House of Representatives' upcoming elections. He was formerly the director of sports activity at Katameya Shooting Club.

Education 

Salah obtained a PhD degree in Sports Administration from Helwan University and a Bachelor of Laws from Cairo University before obtaining a postgraduate diploma in international politics.

Awards 
Salah was selected as one of the 50 best MPs in the Egyptian Parliament.

References 

Political spokespersons
Members of the Parliament of Egypt
Political Union of Economists politicians
Living people
Cairo University alumni
Year of birth missing (living people)